Anil Kumar Bachoo (born आनिल कुमार बचू on 6 September 1953) is a former Vice Prime Minister and Minister of Public Infrastructure, National Development Unit, Land Transport and Shipping of Mauritius. He has been in office since 13 September 2008 and has already held the office from 2000 to 2005 under the leadership of then MSM/MMM coalition government. From 12 July 2005 to 13 September 2008, he was the Minister of Environment.

He is a prominent leader from the Mauritian Labour Party and also a member of parliament for the constituency no 9, Flaq & Bon Acceuil since September 2000. He had previously been MP from 1991 to 1995 until his party alliance MSM/MTD/RMM lost elections to the Mauritian Labour Party alliance.

References

1953 births
Living people
Mauritian politicians
Vice Prime Ministers of Mauritius
Mauritian politicians of Indian descent